Grindelia squarrosa, also known as a curly-top gumweed or curlycup gumweed, is a small North American biennial or short-lived perennial plant.

Description

The plant produces numerous flower heads in open, branching arrays. Each head usually contains 12–40 yellow ray flowers, though sometimes the rays are absent. These surround many small disc flowers. The plant blooms from July through late September. The brown seed is usually four-angled, with loose scales.

Varieties
Grindelia squarrosa var. quasiperennis
Grindelia squarrosa var. serrulata
Grindelia squarrosa var. squarrosa

Distribution and habitat 
The species is native to western and central North America, from British Columbia east to Québec and New England, and south as far as California, New Mexico, Arizona, Chihuahua, and Texas. The species may possibly be naturalized in much of the eastern part of that distribution.

Ecology
The species is listed by the Lady Bird Johnson Wildflower Center Native Plant Information Network as of "Special Value to Native Bees."

Toxicity
The plant concentrates selenium from the soil, and can be toxic when ingested by cattle, humans, and other mammals.

Uses
The flowers and leaves are used by Great Plains Tribes as a medicinal herb to treat illnesses such as asthma, bronchitis or skin rashes. The powdered flowers were also once smoked in cigarettes to ease asthmatic symptoms.

It is used as a traditional medicinal plant by Shoshone peoples in various regions. The Gosiute language name for the plant is mu’-ha-kûm. The Lakota language name for the plant is pteíčhiyuȟa.

Hispanos of New Mexico boiled the buds to make a drink to treat kidney disorders. Extracts have been made to treat skin irritations, asthma, and rheumatism. The resin has been used to treat poison ivy rashes topically.

The plant is being explored as a potential source of biofuel due to its high content of mono- and di-terpenes which can be converted to a fuel analogous to kerosene or jet fuel. The plant's adaptation to arid climates makes it an attractive option as its cultivation in desert areas would not compete with traditional food crops.

References

External links

 Calflora Database: Grindelia squarrosa (Curlycup gumweed)
 

squarrosa
Flora of Canada
Flora of Northeastern Mexico
Flora of Northwestern Mexico
Flora of the Eastern United States
Flora of the Western United States
Flora of the Great Plains (North America)
Flora of California
Flora of the Great Basin
Flora of the Sierra Nevada (United States)
Plants described in 1813
Plants used in traditional Native American medicine
Flora without expected TNC conservation status